The 29th Canadian Film Awards were held on September 21, 1978 to honour achievements in Canadian film. They were the last Canadian Film Awards ceremony to be held before the program was taken over by the Academy of Canadian Cinema and Television, and restructured into the new Genie Awards.

The ceremony was hosted by John Candy and Catherine O'Hara, and was held at the conclusion of the 1978 Festival of Festivals.

Films

Feature Film Craft Awards

Non-Feature Craft Awards

Special Awards
Nelvana - Michael Hirsh, Patrick Loubert and  Clive A. Smith -  “for development in animation”.
Golden Reel Award: Allan King, Who Has Seen the Wind - "for highest-grossing film".
Wendy Michener Award: Richard Gabourie – for outstanding achievement in his first feature, Three Card Monte.
John Grierson Award: Donald Brittain – for outstanding contributions to Canadian cinema.

References

Canadian
1978 in Canadian cinema
Canadian Film Awards (1949–1978)